Daulatpur is a town,  north of Kazi Ahmed and  south of Moro,  in Nawabshah District of the Sindh province of Pakistan. It is also taluka headquarters. It lies on the main N-5 National Highway and is near the Indus River. The Villages Near The Daulatpur Are Sardar Raza Mohammad Dahri, Kharr, Inayatullah Dahri, Dino Machine, KarimAbad, etc. People Of Daulatpur Mostly Speak Urdu And Sindhi. Shahi Bazaar Is The Main Bazaar In Daulatpur. Moro Is At The Distance Of 19.7 km Far From Daulatpur. Most Of The People Have Their Own Shops Or Business

History
It was at the forefront of the Movement for Restoration of Democracy (MRD) of 1983.

Transport
 The main N-5 highway passes through.
 The railway line operated until the 1980s.

References 

Populated places in Shaheed Benazir Abad District
Towns in Pakistan